Rud Avar (also Romanized as Rūd Āvar; also known as Rood Av) is a village in Hayaquq-e Nabi Rural District, in the Central District of Tuyserkan County, Hamadan Province, Iran. At the 2006 census, its population was 662, divided in 189 families.

References 

Populated places in Tuyserkan County